Newport-Mesa Unified School District is a school district in Orange County, California, United States, that mainly serves the cities of Newport Beach and Costa Mesa. The district was founded on July 1, 1966. It currently serves approximately 18,600 at twenty-two elementary schools, two intermediate schools, four high schools, one alternative education center, and one adult education center.

Schools

Preschool
Adams Preschool
College Park Preschool
Davis Magnet Preschool
Harbor View Preschool
Harper Preschool
Killybrooke Preschool
Mariners Preschool
Newport Coast Preschool
Newport Preschool
Paularino Preschool
Pomona Preschool
Pomona Year Round Preschool
Rea Preschool
Sonora Preschool
Victoria Preschool
Whittier Preschool
Whittier Year Round Preschool
Wilson Preschool
Woodland Preschool

Elementary schools
Adams
Andersen
California
College Park
Davis
Eastbluff
Harbor View
Kaiser
Killybrooke
Lincoln
Mariners
Newport Elementary School
Newport Coast
Newport Heights
Paularino
Pomona
Rea
Sonora
Victoria
Whittier
Wilson
Woodland

Intermediate schools
Ensign Intermediate School
Corona Del Mar Middle School
Costa Mesa Middle School
TeWinkle Middle School

High schools
Newport Harbor High School
Costa Mesa High School
Early College High School
Estancia High School
Corona del Mar High School

Alternative Education Centers
Back Bay
Monte Vista
Cloud Campus

See also

List of school districts in Orange County, California

References

External links
Newport-Mesa School District

School districts in Orange County, California
School districts established in 1966
1966 establishments in California